Sustjepan is a village in Croatia, located in the Dubrovnik-Neretva County

External links

Populated places in Dubrovnik-Neretva County